Phoebe Richards (born 26 March 1993) is a field hockey player from Wales, who plays as a forward.

Personal life
Phoebe Richards was born and raised in Knighton, Wales.

In addition to hockey, Richards also used to play football for England at Under–15 and Under–17 levels. Her grandmother is of English descent, allowing her to play for her neighbouring country.

Career

Club hockey
In the English Hockey League, Richards played club hockey for Buckingham from the 2015–2019. In 2019, she transferred clubs to Clifton Robinsons.

National team
Phoebe Richards made her international debut for Wales during the 2012 Celtic Cup.

Since her 2012 debut, Richards has become an integral member of the Welsh team, with continued appearances each year. Her most prominent achievements include representing the national side at the Commonwealth Games in 2014 and 2018.

References

External links
 
 
  (2014)
 

1993 births
Living people
Welsh female field hockey players
British female field hockey players
Field hockey players at the 2014 Commonwealth Games
Field hockey players at the 2018 Commonwealth Games
Commonwealth Games competitors for Wales